Oregon Ballet Theatre (OBT) is a ballet company in Portland, Oregon, United States. The company performs an annual five-program season at the Portland Center for the Performing Arts and conducts regional and national tours. It was featured in the October/November 2007 issue of Pointe magazine, with principal dancer Kathi Martuza on the cover.

History 
The company is the result of the 1989 merger of Ballet Oregon and Pacific Ballet Theater. James Canfield, a former dancer with Joffrey Ballet and principal dancer with Pacific Ballet Theater, served as Artistic Director of Oregon Ballet Theater from its inception until 2003. Under his leadership the company repertoire grew to comprise over 80 ballets, from evening-length works to contemporary pieces.

Stowell
Christopher Stowell was the artistic director from 2003 to the end of 2012. During Stowell's tenure, the company added the work of Sir Frederick Ashton, Jerome Robbins, William Forsythe, Lar Lubovitch, and Christopher Wheeldon to its repertoire. New works have been created on the company by James Kudelka, Trey McIntyre, Yuri Possokhov, Julia Adam, and Nicolo Fonte. In addition, Christopher Stowell choreographed eight new ballets with the company's dancers.

Company

Artistic Directors 

 Danielle Rowe (2023-Present)
 Peter Franc (Interim) (2021-2023)
 Kevin Irving (2013–2021)
 Christopher Stowell (2003-2012)
 James Canfield (1989-2003)

School of Oregon Ballet Theatre
OBT also runs the School of Oregon Ballet Theatre, directed by Marion Tonner.

School Directors 

 Katarina Svetlova (Interim) (2022-present)
 Marion Tonner (2018–2022)
 Anthony Jones (2013-2018)
 Damara Bennett (2003-2013)

See also
List of Oregon Ballet Theatre performers

References

External links

Ballet schools in the United States
 
1989 establishments in Oregon
Performing groups established in 1989